Trevor Wye (born 6 June 1935) is a professional flautist, flute instructor, and author of several books about technical aspects of flute playing. He founded the International Summer School for flute.

The English flautist Trevor Wye  began playing the flute at age 15. Contrary to what might be expected of a famous flautist, Wye did not attend a college of music, nor a conservatory, nor a university, but he later studied with Marcel Moyse whom Wye credits as a major influence on his playing, teaching, and writing career. Wye also studied with flutist Geoffrey Gilbert. He was also influenced by British singer Alfred Deller and flautist William Bennett.

Wye was a freelance orchestral and chamber player in London for many years, and has several solo recordings. He served as a professor at the Guildhall School of Music, London, for fourteen years, and at the Royal Northern College of Music, Manchester, for twenty-two years. The latter school awarded him an honorary degree in 1990.

Perhaps his best known published works are the six-volumed Practice Books for the Flute, which concentrate on tone, technique, articulation, intonation and vibrato, breathing and scales, and advanced practice. He has also published a series titled A Beginner’s Book for the Flute, a piccolo practice book, and several arrangements for flute and piano. His biography of Marcel Moyse has been published in several languages, and an ongoing collaborative project consists of an encyclopedia of the flute. Another work-in-progress is a short biography of Albert Cooper, flute maker.

Wye teaches in his flute studio in Kent, which is a one-year residential course for postgraduate students established in 1990. He travels the world giving masterclasses and concerts, serves on juries for international competitions, and gives recitals. 
He is the general editor of a free, on-line flute encyclopedia called The Flute Ark.

Wye's first and only wife Dot died in October 2022.

List of publications

Wye has published over 170 items including books, CDs, DVDs.

Hobbies
Wye's hobbies include astronomy. He has a home observatory with a 16 inch (~400 mm) Schmitt Cassegrain computerised telescope. He has a large collection of antique flutes, both the western concert variety and other kinds. He demonstrates about 60 of them in his Carnival Show.

Notes

External links 
Trevor Wye's Homepage
Trevor Wye International Flute Summer Course
Larry Krantz' Wye page
Bio at Flute Connection

British flautists
English classical flautists
1935 births
Living people
Place of birth missing (living people)